SLP65/SLP76, Csk-interacting membrane protein, termed SCIMP, belongs to family of transmembrane adaptor proteins (TRAP) which do not directly associate with a receptor, such as LAT, NTAL, LIME or LAX. SCIMP is expressed in antigen-presenting cells (APC), namely B cells, bone marrow-derived dendritic cells and macrophages.

Structure and interactions 

Like other TRAPs, SCIMP has negligible extracellular domain and transmembrane domain followed by intracellular domain, containing several tyrosines and one proline-rich region (PRR). Upon phosphorylation, these tyrosines serve as docking domains for SH2 domains containing proteins. In a contrast to phospho-tyrosines, proline rich regions are generally less susceptible to post-translation modifications and they are rather targets of constitutive interactions with SH3 domains containing proteins. It has been shown that SCIMP interact via SH2 domains with Csk kinase, negative regulator of Src family kinases, but also with Slp65/76 and Grb2 adaptors, which are key pro-signalling soluble adaptor proteins in lymphocyte signalling network. SCIMP is constitutively associated with Lyn kinase via SH3 domain.

Membrane localization 

Some of TRAPs are palmitoylated in a border region between transmembrane and intracellular domain. The aliphatic chain of Palmitic acid is anchored to the membrane bilayer and thus influence protein targeting to membrane microdomains. SCIMP is also palmitoylated and is associated with tetraspanin-enriched mircrodomains (TEMs). TEMs, unlike lipid rafts, are based more on protein-protein interactions than lipid-lipid/lipid-protein interactions. One of the resident proteins in TEMs is MHC class II molecule. SCIMP is present in the immunological synapse during antigen presentation between a T cell and an antigen-presenting cell (APC).

In vitro studies and putative function 

SCIMP becomes strongly phosphorylated after MHC II stimulation. Studies performed with fusion protein CD25-SCIMP showed its ability to induce calcium release and Erk phosphorylation upon anti-CD25 antibody treatment. The calcium release was even stronger in CD25-SCIMP mutant protein in binding side for Csk. Indicating negative feedback loop performed by Csk kinase. Fusion proteins are commonly used in order to study signalling ability of proteins with a small extracellular domain hidden for antibody in membrane glycocalix. However knock down of SCIMP didn´t influence calcium release after anti MHC II antibody treatment, but only decrease level of Erk phosphorylation in longer time point (10 min.)

References 

Immunology
Proteins